is one of Vienna's main railway stations located at the Philadelphiabrücke. When the Südbahnhof (South station) was demolished in December 2009 to build Vienna's new Hauptbahnhof (main station), Wien Meidling assumed the functions of the Südbahnhof and is in the 2020s frequented by 55,000 people daily, up from its usual 45,000, making it one of Austria's busiest railway stations.

Train services
The station is served by the following services:

Intercity Express services (ICE 91) Hamburg - Hanover - Kassel - Nürnberg - Passau - Linz - St Pölten - Vienna - Vienna Airport
Intercity Express services (ICE 91) Dortmund - Essen - Düsseldorf - Cologne - Koblenz - Frankfurt - Nürnberg - Passau - Linz - St Pölten - Vienna - Vienna Airport
RailJet services Zürich - Innsbruck - Salzburg - Linz - St Pölten - Vienna - Győr - Budapest
RailJet services Munich - Salzburg - Linz - St Pölten - Vienna - Győr - Budapest
RailJet services Frankfurt - Stuttgart - Munich - Salzburg - Linz - St Pölten - Vienna - Győr - Budapest
RailJet services Graz - Vienna - Breclav - Brno - Pardubice - Prague
RailJet services Villach - Klagenfurt - Vienna
EuroCity services Vienna - Győr - Budapest - Kiskunmajsa - Novi Sad - Belgrade
EuroCity services Vienna - Győr - Budapest - Debrecen
EuroCity services Vienna - Breclav - Ostrava - Katowice - Warsaw
EuroCity services Zagreb - Maribor - Graz - Vienna
EuroNight services Rome - Florence - Bologna - Venice - Villach - Klagenfurt - Vienna

References

Notes

Bibliography

External links 
 
 

Buildings and structures in Meidling
Meidling
Railway stations in Austria opened in 1841
Railway stations in Austria opened in the 19th century